The Wolf Prize in Medicine is awarded annually by the Wolf Foundation in Israel. It is one of the six Wolf Prizes established by the Foundation and awarded since 1978; the others are in Agriculture, Chemistry, Mathematics, Physics and Arts. The Prize has been stated to be the second most prestigious award in science, and a significant predictor of the Nobel Prize.

Laureates
Source:

Laureates per country 
Below is a chart of all laureates per country (updated to 2023 laureates). Some laureates are counted more than once if have multiple citizenship.

See also

 List of medicine awards

Notes and references

External links 
 
 
 
 Wolf Prizes 2015
 Jerusalempost Israel-Wolf-Prizes 2016
 Jerusalempost Israel-Wolf-Prizes 2017
 Wolf Prize 2019

Medicine awards
Medicine
Lists of Israeli award winners
Awards established in 1978
Israeli science and technology awards
1978 establishments in Israel